Ronald Banful (born January 17, 1990), known professionally as GuiltyBeatz, is a Ghanaian DJ and record producer. Born in Palermo, Italy, GuiltyBeatz first gained prominence as a music producer after his production on "Bad girl" by Jesse Jagz ft. Wizkid, "Sample You" by Mr. Eazi and his hit "Akwaaba" featuring Mr. Eazi, Pappy Kojo & Patapaa.

Background/early life
GuiltyBeatz was born in Palermo, Italy, he relocated to Ghana at age six. He was introduced to music at the age of 1, when he received his first piano. His interest for music was realized when he was a child and his passion has grown ever since. 
At the age of 12, GuiltyBeatz began to create his own personal beats with the "Music DJ" application on his Sony Ericsson phone. It was during this period that he became known for producing. His career started off more or less as he created beats for rap battles in Junior High School.

At age 17, GuiltyBeatz received a personal computer which enabled him to study and master beat making with Fruity Loops. He improved daily by recreating beats from hit songs in the American Music Industry.
Aside beats making, GuiltyBeatz is a talented piano player and he single-handedly learnt this skill. He achieved this by gathering inspiration from people around him. Self taught talent has given him an upper hand in the Ghanaian music industry.

In April 2010, GuiltyBeatz was signed by the Ghanaian record label "Star Productions". He then began using Logic Pro for music production. Guilty had the opportunity to work with many Ghanaian artistes such as Sarkodie, R2Bees, Efya, DCryme, Atumpan, Stonebwoy, Pappy Kojo, Jeed Rogers, Chase, Mr Eazi, Bisa Kdei and many more.

He has also had the opportunity to work with talent artistes outside Ghana, such as Jesse Jagz, Wizkid, Wande Coal, Cabo Snoop (Angola), KaySwitch and Mr. Walz in Nigeria.
He has stretched as far as the UK to work with Mr Silva, Sway, Tribal Magz and Moelogo.

Musical career
Guiltybeatz started his music production career actively when he joined Star Productions (S.T.A.R Baby) in 2010. He has produced Hip Pop, HipLife, HighLife, Dancehall, Afro-pop, etc. But his personal interest has always been Afro-pop and Afro-fusion. He added the deejaying as part of his brand in 2018. As an Afro-Pop producer/deejay, GuiltyBeatz has released many singles already. In 2016, he released his debut "Chance" featuring Mr. Eazi.

2018: Akwaaba
GuiltyBeatz in 2018 released "Akwaaba" that featured Mr Eazi, Patapaa, Pappy Kojo. In 2018, "Akwaaba" was first ranked by Face2Face Africa on its list of "Top 10 most popular African songs of 2018". This track turned out to be his big break, and got him several awards and nominations.

2019: The Lion King: The Gift
GuiltyBeatz has production credits for three songs on Beyoncé's album The Lion King: The Gift in 2019. He has production credits for three songs off the album namely, "Already", "Keys to The Kingdom" and "Find Your Way Back".

Discography

EPs
Different (2020)

Songs

Production credits 

Notes
  signifies a co-producer
  signifies a miscellaneous producer

Awards and nominations

References

External links
 

Living people
Ghanaian musicians
Ghanaian record producers
1990 births